WNS (Holdings) Limited is a global business process management company headquartered in Mumbai, India. The company has its expansion with 60 delivery centers worldwide.

History
WNS was founded in 1996 by British Airways as Speedwing World Network Services in Mumbai. In May 2002, a 70% shareholding was sold to Warburg Pincus. 
 1999 – Launches delivery centre in Pune, India.
 2004 – Sets up new centres in Colombo in Sri Lanka and Gurugram in India.
 2006 – Initial public offering listing on the NYSE, the first Indian business process outsourcing company to be listed on the exchange. It raises about $224 million at $20 per ADS.
 2008 – Launches new delivery centres in the Philippines and Romania and Acquires Aviva Global Services, BizAps (SAP consulting) and Call 24/7 in U.K.
 2012 – Sets up first delivery centre in North America to service US clients. It also sets up a centre in Poland.
 2013 – Launches new centre in China and Warburg Pincus sells its entire stake in WNS.
 2014 – Launches new centre in Pennsylvania.

Acquisitions
2003: WNS acquires Town & Country Assistance Limited; a UK-based automobile claims handling company.
2004: Acquired the health business of Greensnow.
2006: Acquired Trinity Partners Inc, a provider of BPO services to financial institutions, the fare audit services business from PRG Airlines; and the financial accounting business from GHS Holdings LLC.
2007: Acquires Marketics, a provider of offshore analytics services.
2008: Acquires Accidents Happen Assistance Limited, or AHA (formerly known as Call 24-7); BizAps, a provider of systems applications and products; and finally Aviva Global Services.
2011: Acquires shares from joint venture partner, Paxys, Inc., and assumed full control of the Philippines centre.
2012: Takes over Fusion Outsourcing Services in South Africa.
 2016 – Acquired Value Edge.
 2017 – Acquired Denali Sourcing Services and HealthHelp.
 2022 - WNS acquires enterprise automation services company, Vuram. and The Smart Cube, a London-headquartered provider of platform-driven research and analytics.

References

External links

British Airways
Business process outsourcing companies of India
Companies based in Mumbai
Companies listed on the New York Stock Exchange
Outsourcing companies
Warburg Pincus companies
Business services companies established in 1996
Indian companies established in 1996
1996 establishments in Maharashtra